Clara Ledesma Terrazas (5 March 1924 – 25 May 1999) was an artist from the Dominican Republic.

Early years and education
Born in Santiago de los Caballeros, she initially studied art under Yoryi Morel in his academy in that city. Ledesma later enrolled in the National School of Fine Arts in Santo Domingo, graduating in 1948. "Ledesma was one of the first women to join the National School of Fine Arts."   Her professors included Celeste Woss y Gil and George Hausdorf, while her primary mentor was painting professor Josep Gausachs. Fellow students included Gilberto Hernández Ortega and Eligio Pichardo.

After graduating, she taught drawing at the National School of Fine Arts.

Career, continuing education and personal life
In 1949, Ledesma had her first solo exhibition and in 1951 she opened a studio/gallery, where she displayed her works as well as those of other artists. With the proceeds from a very successful solo exhibition in 1952, Ledesma traveled to Europe to further her education. She studied painting in Barcelona and Madrid, and exhibited her works in galleries in Spain. Ledesma also traveled to Lisbon and Paris to visit important museums. She was particularly influenced by the works of Marc Chagall, Joan Miró and Paul Klee. During her stay in Europe, Ledesma met Bolivian,native American artist Walter Terrazas, who returned to Santo Domingo with her in 1954.

"She studied painting at prestigious academies abroad and then returned to the country where she presented works that she had conducted in Europe under the influence of Miro, Chagall and Paul Klee, among others."

In Santo Domingo, she worked closely with other important Dominican artists, including Gilberto Hernández Ortega, Josep Gausachs and Jaime Colson. In 1955, she was named vice director of the National School of Fine Arts.

In 1961, Clara Ledesma and her husband moved to New York City, New York, where she opened another gallery. She lived and worked in New York City the rest of her life.

Exhibitions and artwork
Ledesma had numerous international solo exhibitions, including events in Madrid, Mexico City and New York City, and participated in group exhibitions in Brazil, Spain, Cuba, Haiti, Venezuela, Argentina and Puerto Rico.
 
Ledesma's style ranged from Expressionism and Surrealism to Abstraction. She is known for her use of brilliant colors, imaginative figures and the feeling of magic and mysticism created in her paintings and drawings. In 1955, journalist Horia Tanasescu described her work, "At times ironic, often playful, but taking great care in the production of her paintings, this artist introduces an enthusiasm for life to the national art scene that is in striking contrast to the solemnity of the majority of her fellow artists."

"Ledesma also touched on social realism in her work, with her most noted series underlining the racial inequities of the time.” 

"She tried to represent native paintings, with concern, but away from the drama. One of her best stage was marked by the issue of blackness."

Her artwork can be found in various private collections worldwide. It can also be found in the Metropolitan Museum of New York, the Metropolitan Museum of Miami, the Museum of Modern Art in Mexico, the Contemporary Art of Madrid and the Gallery of Modern Art. Ledesma's work has also been featured in the Sarduy Gallery of New York, Art Gallery Nader, Signs of New York, and the Gallery of Modern Art in Santo Domingo.

Awards and achievements 
 Premio Nicaragua y Medalla de Oro. Awards
 Won first prize for la Bienal de Santo Domingo with her painting "El Sacrificio del Chivo" (The Sacrifice of the Goat). 
 In 1960 she obtained second prize with her painting titled "Crepusculo en una Aldea" (Twilight in a Village), and won first prize in Pintura de Bellas Artes en escultura (Beautiful Paintings in Sculptures) in 1948.
 Ledesma was selected for the collective for the Medical Association for Puerto Rico titled "Maestros del Continente" (Teachers of the Continent). 
 In 1960 she was contracted by the gallery The Contemporaries of New York in order to showcase her art, which received praise from numerous newspapers.

Death
Ledesma died in Jamaica, Queens, at the age of 75.

See also

 List of Dominican painters
 Visual art of the United States
 Women Surrealists

References

De los Santos, Danilo, Memoria de la pintura dominicana, Volumen 3, Santo Domingo: Grupo León Jimenes, 2004.
Tanasescu, Horia, La Exposición de Clara Ledesma (Galería Nacional de Bellas Artes). El Caribe, Santo Domingo, March 6, 1954.

1924 births
1999 deaths
20th-century American painters
Abstract painters
American company founders
American women company founders
American Expressionist painters
American surrealist artists
American women painters
20th-century Dominican Republic painters
Dominican Republic women artists
Dominican Republic emigrants to the United States
Dominican Republic expatriates in Spain
People from Santiago de los Caballeros
Dominican Republic women painters
20th-century Dominican Republic artists
Women surrealist artists
20th-century American women